Will Meisel (17 September 1897 – 29 April 1967) was a German composer, who wrote more than fifty film scores during his career. He also wrote several operettas including A Friend So Lovely as You (1930) (Eine Freundin so goldig wie du).

Selected filmography
 The Other (1930)
 The Prosecutor Hallers (1930)
 Love in the Ring (1930)
 A Storm Over Zakopane (1931)
 When the Soldiers (1931)
 The Unknown Guest (1931)
 Checkmate (1931)
 A Crafty Youth (1931)
 Queen of the Night (1931)
 At Your Orders, Sergeant (1932)
 Tugboat M 17 (1933)
 What Am I Without You (1934)
 The Sun Rises (1934)
 The Champion of Pontresina (1934) 
 Gypsy Blood (1934)
 Every Day Isn't Sunday (1935)
 Trouble Backstairs (1935)
 Fräulein Veronika (1936)
 Family Parade (1936)
 Carousel (1937)
 Little County Court (1938)
 Marriage in Small Doses (1939)
 Queen of the Night (1951)
 The Inn on the Lahn (1955)

References

Bibliography 
 Grange, William. Cultural Chronicle of the Weimar Republic. Scarecrow Press, 2008.

External links 
 

1897 births
1967 deaths
Musicians from Berlin
20th-century German composers
Recipients of the Cross of the Order of Merit of the Federal Republic of Germany